Statistics of JSL Cup in the 1991 season.

Overview
It was contested by 28 teams, and Yomiuri won the championship.

Results

1st round
Tanabe Pharmaceuticals 2-1 Cosmo Oil
Toshiba 2-0 Otsuka Pharmaceutical
Hitachi 8-0 Toho Titanium
NKK 1-0 Kyoto Shiko
Matsushita Electric 1-0 Tokyo Gas
Toyota Motors 3-0 Yomiuri Juniors
Yomiuri 6-0 Chuo Bohan
Mitsubishi Motors 2-4 Sumitomo Metals
Yamaha Motors 1-3 Fujitsu
Mazda 3-2 NTT Kanto
Yanmar Diesel 1-4 Kofu
Fujita Industries 2-0 Kawasaki Steel

2nd round
Honda 7-1 Tanabe Pharmaceuticals
Toshiba 1-1 (PK 4-5) Hitachi
NKK 1-2 Matsushita Electric
Toyota Motors 3-3 (PK 4-5) Nissan Motors
All Nippon Airways 1-3 Yomiuri
Sumitomo Metals 0-3 Fujitsu
Mazda 3-1 Kofu
Fujita Industries 1-0 Furukawa Electric

Quarterfinals
Honda 2-2 (PK 6-5) Hitachi
Matsushita Electric 0-1 Nissan Motors
Yomiuri 4-1 Fujitsu
Mazda 1-1 (PK 4-2) Fujita Industries

Semifinals
Honda 0-0 (PK 4-2) Nissan Motors
Yomiuri 1-0 Mazda

Final
Honda 3-4 Yomiuri
Yomiuri won the championship

References
 

JSL Cup
Lea